Maria Michelle Fitzpatrick (born February 18, 1949) is a Canadian politician who was elected in the 2015 Alberta general election to the Legislative Assembly of Alberta representing the electoral district of Lethbridge-East.

Early life 
Fitzpatrick was born and raised in St. John's, Newfoundland and Labrador. She is a former sprinter who competed in the Canada Summer Games, Canadian Track and Field Championships, National University Indoor Championships, Halifax Highland Games, Antigonish Highland Games, and Royal Canadian Legion Provincial Championships. In 1969, she was named the Athlete of the Year for St. John's. She later coached various track and field teams in the Yukon, Northwest Territories, and Alberta. In 2005, she was named to the Newfoundland and Labrador Athletics Association Hall of Fame. Fitzpatrick is a trustee on the Lethbridge Labour Council, vice president of the  Canadian Federation of University Women, and chair of the regional women's committee of the Public Service Alliance of Canada. She worked for 32 years with the Correctional Service of Canada, most recently as a project officer.

Political career 
In November 2015, during debate on a private member's bill to improve supports for victims of domestic violence, Fitzpatrick spoke in the legislature about her own experience, having been married to an abusive husband in the 1970s. She earned a standing ovation in the legislature for her speech, and the bill unanimously passed second reading soon afterward.

Electoral history

2019 general election

2015 general election

References

1949 births
Alberta New Democratic Party MLAs
Canadian female sprinters
Living people
Politicians from St. John's, Newfoundland and Labrador
Women MLAs in Alberta
Sportspeople from Lethbridge
Sportspeople from St. John's, Newfoundland and Labrador
21st-century Canadian politicians
21st-century Canadian women politicians